Chloe Asaam is a fashion designer and program manager for the OR Foundation, an organization focused on addressing fast fashion waste in Ghana, such as markets like Kantamanto Market. Her focus is on sustainable and handmade garments that capture the context of Ghana alongside larger fashion trends. She was highlighted by the Mercedes-Benz Fashion Week Tbilisi, Mercedes Benz Fashion Week Accra,  and The Fashion Atlas. She is originally from Kumasi.

References

External links 
Op-Ed on her experiences with textile waste in Ghana

Ghanaian fashion designers
Ghanaian women fashion designers
Living people
People from Kumasi
Year of birth missing (living people)